Swimming at the 19th Central American and Caribbean Games occurred in November 2002 in San Salvador, El Salvador. The competition consisted of 32 events: 16 for males, 16 for females; with 13 individual and 3 relays each. All were swum in a long course (50m) pool.

Results

Men

Female

References
 The Oldest Regional Games: Central American & Caribbean Sports Games, by Enrique Montesinos. Published by CACSO in 2009; retrieved 2012-04.

2002 Central American and Caribbean Games
2002 in swimming